Marko Bulat (born 21 April 1973) is a Serbian pop-folk singer and musician.

He has authored popular songs in the vein of Aca Lukas, even performing on the riverboat Lukas. He is very popular among the younger generations, numbering among the most popular local live singers. He has released nine live albums and has plans for two upcoming albums where he will both write lyrics and compose music by himself.

Discography
 Srebrne kiše (1996)
 Dete sreće (1997)
 Prijatelji, braćo, kumovi... (2003)
 Ne postoji sutra  (2004)
 Nebeska kafana (2007)
 Dan za dan (2009)

Personal life
He is a big fan of Star Wars and he has a big collection of movie memorabilia. He is also a devoted Eastern Orthodox Christian and adores Greece.

External links
 Official website

1973 births
Living people
Musicians from Smederevo
21st-century Serbian male singers
Grand Production artists
20th-century Serbian male singers
Serbian turbo-folk singers